Tyler Perry's Assisted Living is an American television sitcom created and produced by Tyler Perry that premiered on BET on September 2, 2020. David Mann and Tamela Mann reprised their roles from Meet the Browns. On May 3, 2021, BET announced that the second season would premiere on May 25, 2021. On the same day, it was renewed for a third season, ahead of the second season premiere. The third season premiered on March 23, 2022. On February 28, 2023, it was announced that the fourth season will premiere on March 22, 2023.

Plot 
After losing his job, Jeremy and his family decide to move back to Georgia to help his grandfather, who ends up buying a run-down home for the elderly and becomes way in over his head. Mr. Brown and Cora show up at the right time to be investors and run the retirement home with Vinny.

Cast

Main
David Mann as Leroy "Mr. Brown" Brown
Tamela Mann as Cora Simmons-Brown
J. Anthony Brown as Vinny
Na'im Lynn as Jeremy
Courtney Nichole as Leah
Tayler Buck as Sandra
Alex Henderson as Phillip
Damien Leake as Reginald June (season 2)
Chet Anekwe as Efe Omowafe (season 2)
Alretha Thomas as Anastasia Devereaux (seasons 2 & 3)
 Tyler Perry as Mabel Madea simmons

Recurring
Nicholas Duvernay as Lindor
Rob Bouton as Todd the Inspector

Episodes

Series overview

Season 1 (2020–21)

Season 2 (2021–22)

Season 3 (2022)

Season 4 (2023)

References

External links
 
 

2020 American television series debuts
2020s American black sitcoms
BET original programming
Assisted Living
Assisted Living
Television shows set in Atlanta
Television shows filmed in Atlanta